Sperryville is a census-designated place (CDP) located in the western section of Rappahannock County, Virginia, United States, near Shenandoah National Park. It consists of a village with two main streets along the two branches of the Thornton River, together with surrounding pasture- and farmland. The population as of the 2010 Census was 342.

History 
The land on which Sperryville is located is part of 3,000 acres granted by King George II of Great Britain to Francis Thornton in 1731.  This land was regranted to Thornton in 1751 by Thomas Fairfax, 6th Lord Fairfax of Cameron, owner of the Northern Neck Proprietary, after Fairfax won his suit to prevent the king from granting land in the Proprietary. Part of this land was inherited by a descendant, also named Francis Thornton, in 1817. He was a soldier in the War of 1812, became a Presbyterian minister, and was sent from his home in Fredericksburg, Virginia, to organize a Presbyterian church in what was then western Culpeper County. In 1820 he began selling small lots of land along the main road (currently Main Street, VA Route 1001). The first deed was for a ½-acre lot “in a little town laid off by me, the said Francis Thornton Jr., and surveyed by Johnston Menefee … the village is in a flat adjoining the lands of John Menefee between the Pass Mill (today’s Fletcher’s Mill) and Thornton’s Gap.” The village of Sperryville is named on an 1821 map of Culpeper County created by John Wood.

On one of the lots, John Hopkins established an ‘ordinary’ that later became a boarding house for immigrant Irish laborers. On another lot was a tavern and stage coach office to serve people traveling from Culpeper Court House to New Market, Virginia. On other lots were a cobbler’s shop, stores, and individual homes. In the early 1800s John Kiger built Conestoga wagons in the area. The post office was established in the village in 1840. In the 1850s several turnpikes were constructed that accessed Sperryville: Thornton’s Gap from Culpeper to Sperryville, Newmarket & Sperryville, and Sperryville-Rappahannock from Sperryville east to the Rappahannock River. A tannery and worker’s homes were constructed in the late 1860s by the Smoot family.  Four churches were established in the area by 1880, as well as a woolen mill, seven distillers, two hotels, four general stores, and one saloon.  There were also ten corn and flour mills nearby. An apple processing facility was built in 1918 to serve the many local apple orchardists. Sperryville high school was constructed adjacent to the town. In the 1930s, a Civilian Conservation Corps camp located at Beech Spring west of the village provided farmers with a nearby market for produce, meat, milk, and eggs to feed the corpsmen housed there.  The Sperryville apple packing and juice plant was created on the site of the former Smoot tannery.

The Sperryville Historic District was listed on the Virginia Landmarks Registry in 1982 and on the National Register of Historic Places in 1983.

Attractions
Sperryville continued as a small rural town with modest amenities until the opening of Skyline Drive in the late 1930s. The area became saturated with gasoline stations, roadside businesses, lunch rooms, restaurants, and motels. Modern Sperryville continues to cater to tourists and locals alike, but has reinvented itself with chic restaurants, bars, artisan shops, artist studios, bed and breakfast accommodations, and antique stores. The village and its environs also have wineries, a brewery, a distillery, and a 9-hole golf course. Roadside stands have given way to family farm and community-supported agricultural markets. Many homes and the schoolhouse have been repurposed into commercial ventures. The annual Sperryfest celebrates the vibrant community.

The village is located at the foothills of the Blue Ridge mountains and, via U.S. Route 211, provides access to the Thornton Gap entrance of Shenandoah National Park and Skyline Drive. Popular nearby hiking trails in the Park include the Buck Hollow/Buck Ridge trail, Thornton River trail, White Oak Canyon, and Old Rag Mountain.

Pen Druid is a brewery offering beer, wine, and cider. It is owned and operated by three brothers who are in the psych-rock band Pontiak. Washingtonian magazine says, “The Carney brothers (Lain, Van, and Jennings) opened the Pen Druid brewery (named for the Carney family farm on the Thornton River just a few miles away) in August 2015. In the years since, they’ve built a reputation for their low-intervention, terroir-driven method of brewing—the same processes in the natural wine craze—to make beer ‘that tastes like it’s from a place,’ Van says. Taking cues from traditional German and Czech breweries, the Carney brothers use wood-fired kettles and a mix of wild and open fermentation with native yeasts to age brews up to three years.”  Celebrity restaurateur Chef Jose Andres has stated on his Instagram page, "Without a doubt, this is one of the best beers anywhere in America," referring to Pen Druid's Three Cerise beer.

The Copper Fox Distillery, a distiller of American whiskey, is based in Sperryville. Central Coffee Roasters a small batch artisan coffee roaster, is located 1/2 mile west towards the Shenandoah National Park. Haley Fine Art, located on Main Street, features paintings, sculptures and photography by local and regional artists.

  In 2018, Happy Camper Equipment Co., situated at one entrance to historic Main Street, painted a mural reading "Welcome to Sperryville" on a side of the building that has become a point of pride in the community and a local attraction.

Three Blacksmiths restaurant, owned by John and Diane MacPherson, was inspired by their travels to London, Slovenia, Switzerland, France and Italy.  The reference to three blacksmiths comes from the book Beyond the Rim: From Slavery to Redemption in the Rappahannock by James D. Russell.  The author describes a long-ago Sperryville, bustling enough to employ a trio of blacksmiths.

Sperryville is the setting for parts of the 8th Jack Reacher novel, The Enemy, by Lee Child.

Further reading
Hanson, Raus (1969). From Virginia Place Names. Verona, Virginia: McClure Press. ISBN
Arnold, Scott (2007). A Guidebook to Virginia's Historical Markers. Charlottesville: University of Virginia Press. .
Hite, Mary (1950). My Rappahannock (Virginia) Story Book. Richmond, Virginia: The Dietz Press Incorporated. ISBN
Lynch, Kathryn (2007). Images of America: Rappahannock County. Charleston, SC: Arcadia Publishing. .
McCarthy, Eugene (1984). The View from Rappahannock. McLean, Virginia: EPM Publications, Inc.. .
Russell, James D (2003). Beyond the Rim: From Slavery to Redemption in Rappahannock. .

References

Census-designated places in Rappahannock County, Virginia
Populated places established in 1817
1817 establishments in Virginia
Census-designated places in Virginia